Arnaud Art (born 28 January 1993) is a Belgian athlete who specialises in the pole vault. He competed at the 2015 World Championships in Beijing without qualifying for the final. His personal bests in the event are 5.72 metres outdoors (Liege 2018) and 5.61 metres indoors (Rennes 2016).

Competition record

1No mark in the final

References

External links
 

1993 births
Living people
Belgian male pole vaulters
World Athletics Championships athletes for Belgium
Sportspeople from Liège
Athletes (track and field) at the 2010 Summer Youth Olympics
People from Hannut